A Life In Pop is a 2006 documentary about English electronic dance music duo Pet Shop Boys. It was originally broadcast on Channel 4 in May 2006 and an expanded version followed on DVD in October.

The documentary was directed by George Scott and produced by Nick de Grunwald. Contributors included Robbie Williams, Brandon Flowers, Peter Robinson, Tim Rice-Oxley, West End Girls, Jake Shears, and Bruce Weber.

References

External links 
 Pet Shop Boys Official Site
 IMDB Page

Pet Shop Boys
2006 television films
2006 films
2006 documentary films